Źródła may refer to the following places in Poland:
Źródła, Lower Silesian Voivodeship (south-west Poland)
Źródła, Kuyavian-Pomeranian Voivodeship (north-central Poland)
Źródła, Lesser Poland Voivodeship (south Poland)